Spencer Liam Robinson (born 29 December 1965 in Bradford), known as Liam Robinson, is an English former professional footballer who played as a striker in the Football League for Huddersfield Town, Tranmere Rovers, Bury, Bristol City, Burnley and Scarborough. He began his career as an apprentice with Nottingham Forest, but never played for the first team, and after Scarborough he played non-league football for teams including Northwich Victoria, Stalybridge Celtic, Stocksbridge Park Steels, Queensbury, Harrogate Railway, Eccleshill United and Rossendale United.

References

External links
 

1965 births
Living people
English footballers
Association football forwards
Nottingham Forest F.C. players
Huddersfield Town A.F.C. players
Tranmere Rovers F.C. players
Bury F.C. players
Bristol City F.C. players
Burnley F.C. players
Scarborough F.C. players
Northwich Victoria F.C. players
Stalybridge Celtic F.C. players
Stocksbridge Park Steels F.C. players
Rossendale United F.C. players
Eccleshill United F.C. players
English Football League players
Harrogate Railway Athletic F.C. players
Footballers from Bradford